Lalveri is a peak  of the Greater Caucasus Mountain Range in the Svaneti region of Georgia adjacent to the Georgia–Russia border. The elevation of the mountain is 4,350 meters (14,268 ft.) above sea level.  The most accessible climbing route to the summit of Lalveri is through the Tsaneri Glacier.

References

Mountains of Georgia (country)
Svaneti
Four-thousanders of the Caucasus
Georgia (country)–Russia border
Mountains of Kabardino-Balkaria
International mountains of Europe